Böyük Kəhrizli (also, Bëyuk Kyagrizli, Beyuk-Khagrizli, and Kyagrizli-Nasirbeyli) is a village and municipality in the Aghjabadi Rayon of Azerbaijan.  It has a population of 613.

References 

Populated places in Aghjabadi District